The Danville Demolition were an American Indoor Football Association team played in 2007.  The team played their home games at the David S. Palmer Arena.

History 
On June 19, 2006, the AIFA announced that Danville would get a team to play at the Palmer Arena. Commissioner Andrew Haines owned the team (like most others) until a suitable owner could be found.  Local radio station WDAN held a name-the-team contest, with 95% of the entries beginning with the letter "D".

On August 16 the team announced their name, the Danville Demolition, as well as their new owner, South Bend, Indiana businessman John Christner, as well as a head coach, B.J. Luke (replaced midseason by Willie Davis).  The winning name was submitted by Michael Burmeister of Racine, Wisconsin.

The team struggled on and off the field, with only one win (against the Erie Freeze at home on March 29) Demolition owner, John Christner decided to shut down the Danville franchise due to dwindling attendance and sponsorship. Christner still owns the AIFA franchise and hopes to locate the franchise somewhere in
the midwest.

The Ultimate Indoor Football League has selected Danville as an expansion site for the 2012 season.

Season-By-Season 

|-
|2007 || 1 || 12 || 0 || 6th Northern || --

2007 Season Schedule

External links 
 Official Site
 Story Announcing Team Name, Owner, Coach
 Demolition's 2007 Stats

American Indoor Football Association teams
American football teams in Illinois
Demo
2006 establishments in Illinois
2007 disestablishments in Illinois
American football teams established in 2006
American football teams disestablished in 2007